The SAGA System is a role-playing game system that uses "fate cards" to determine the effects of actions. The cards have numbers, suits, positive and negative states, and role-playing cues that guide the gamemaster in telling the story and administering the game. The system has been used in TSR, Inc.'s Dragonlance: Fifth Age game  and the Marvel Super Heroes Adventure Game, later published by TSR. Sue Cook was the brand manager for both of those game systems, and helped design the SAGA game rules.

In SAGA, a player holds a hand of fate cards that represent his health and the range of actions he can take. The maximum number of cards he can hold is determined by the number of quests he has completed. This replaces the experience points system of many other role-playing games. The cards replace dice-rolling, as well. When a player attempts an action, he plays a card from his hand. If the suit on the card matches the action type (swords for strength-related actions, for example) it is considered "Trump." Playing a trump card means that the player can draw another card from the top of the Fate Deck and add the number on it to his total for attempting the action. When a character takes damage, the player must discard the number of points of damage to be taken from his hand. When a player has no more cards in his hand, the character is unconscious.

References

Role-playing game systems